"Loving You (Ole Ole Ole)" is the second single from Brian Harvey's debut solo album, Solo. The track is a collaboration with The Refugee Crew. The single was released on 15 October 2001, reaching #20 on the UK Singles Chart.

Music video

The official music video for the song was directed by Andy Morahan.

Track listing
 UK CD1 (0132325ERE)
 "Loving You (Ole Ole Ole)" - 4:05
 "Chains" - 3:36
 "Loving You (Ole Ole Ole)" (Brian Harvey Only) - 3:26
 "Loving You (Ole Ole Ole)" (CD-Rom Video) - 4:10

 UK CD2 (0133045ERE)
 "Loving You (Ole Ole Ole)" (Original) - 4:05
 "Loving You (Ole Ole Ole)" (Ignorants Remix) - 4:10
 "Loving You (Ole Ole Ole)" (Ignorants Dub) - 4:10

References

2001 songs
2001 singles
Brian Harvey songs
Edel AG singles
Music videos directed by Andy Morahan
Song recordings produced by Jerry Duplessis
Song recordings produced by Wyclef Jean
Songs written by Wyclef Jean
Wyclef Jean songs